Brandella is a genus of flowering plants belonging to the family Boraginaceae.

Its native range is Egypt, Northeastern Tropical Africa, Arabian Peninsula.

Species:

Brandella erythraea

References

Boraginaceae
Boraginaceae genera